Pope Felix I was the bishop of Rome from 5 January 269 to his death on 30 December 274.

Life and works
A Roman by birth, Felix was chosen to be pope on 5 January 269, in succession to Dionysius, who had died on 26 December 268.

Felix was the author of an important dogmatic letter on the unity of Christ's Person. He received Emperor Aurelian's aid in settling a theological dispute between the anti-Trinitarian Paul of Samosata, who had been deprived of the bishopric Antioch by a council of bishops for heresy, and the orthodox Domnus, Paul's successor. Paul refused to give way, and in 272 Aurelian was asked to decide between the rivals. He ordered the church building to be given to the bishop who was "recognized by the bishops of Italy and of the city of Rome" (Felix). See Eusebius, Hist. Ecc. vii. 30.

The text of that letter was later interpolated by a follower of Apollinaris in the interests of his sect.

The notice about Felix in the Liber Pontificalis ascribes to him a decree that Masses should be celebrated on the tombs of martyrs ("Hic constituit supra memorias martyrum missas celebrare"). The author of this entry was evidently alluding to the custom of celebrating Mass privately at the altars near or over the tombs of the martyrs in the crypts of the catacombs (missa ad corpus), while the solemn celebration always took place in the basilicas built over the catacombs. This practice, still in force at the end of the fourth century, dates apparently from the period when the great cemeterial basilicas were built in Rome, and owes its origin to the solemn commemoration services of martyrs, held at their tombs on the anniversary of their burial, as early as the third century. Felix probably issued no such decree, but the compiler of the Liber Pontificalis attributed it to him because he made no departure from the custom in force in his time.

Death and veneration

The acts of the Council of Ephesus give Pope Felix as a martyr; but this detail, which occurs again in the biography of the pope in the Liber Pontificalis, is unsupported by any authentic earlier evidence and is manifestly due to a confusion of names. According to the notice in the Liber Pontificalis, Felix erected a basilica on the Via Aurelia; the same source also adds that he was buried there. The latter detail is evidently an error, for the fourth-century Roman calendar of feasts says that Pope Felix was interred in the Catacomb of Callixtus on the Via Appia. The statement of the Liber Pontificalis concerning the pope's martyrdom results obviously from a confusion with a Roman martyr of the same name buried on the Via Aurelia, and over whose grave a church was built. In the Roman "Feriale" or calendar of feasts, referred to above, the name of Felix occurs in the list of Roman bishops (Depositio episcoporum), and not in that of the martyrs.

According to the above-mentioned detail of the Depositio episcoporum, Felix was interred in the catacomb of Callixtus on 30 December, "III Kal. Jan." (third day to the calends of January) in the Roman dating system. Saint Felix I is mentioned as Pope and Martyr, with a simple feast, on 30 May. This date, given in the Liber Pontificalis as that of his death (III Kal. Jun.), is probably an error which could easily occur through a transcriber writing "Jun." for "Jan." This error persisted in the General Roman Calendar until 1969 (see General Roman Calendar of 1960), by which time the mention of Saint Felix I was reduced to a commemoration in the weekday Mass by decision of Pope Pius XII (see General Roman Calendar of Pope Pius XII). Thereafter, the feast of Saint Felix I, no longer mentioned in the General Roman Calendar, is celebrated on his true day of death, 30 December, and without the qualification of "martyr".

According to more recent studies, the oldest liturgical books indicate that the saint honoured on 30 May was a little-known martyr buried on the Via Aurelia, who was mistakenly identified with Pope Felix I, an error similar to but less curious than the identification in the liturgical books, until the mid-1950s, of the martyr saint celebrated on 30 July with the antipope Felix II.

See also
List of Catholic saints
List of popes

References

External links
Writings attributed to Pope Felix I

274 deaths
3rd-century archbishops
3rd-century Christian martyrs
3rd-century Romans
Italian popes
Papal saints
Clergy from Rome
Popes
Year of birth unknown
3rd-century popes